Nüxiu may refer to:

Lady Xiu, a figure of Chinese mythology who gave birth to Daye, ancestor of the House of Ying, after swallowing the egg of a black bird
Nü Xiu, the Mandarin name of the Girl lunar mansion in traditional Chinese astronomy